The America's Cup was a continental cup in men's volleyball for North and South American nations organized by CSV and NORCECA with the first edition in 1998. It is no longer held since 2008.

Results

Medal table

Details

See also
American Championships

References
Sports123

   

 
Recurring events disestablished in 2008